Darrous is a neighborhood in Shemiran, northern Tehran, Iran. It is considered one of the most affluent areas in the city, as many modern and fashionable families reside there. Darrous is bounded by Pasdaran, Gholhak, Doulat, and Ekhtiyarieh.

Haj Mehdi Gholi Khan Hedayat (Mokhber-ol Saltaneh), a renowned aristocrat of the late Qajar period, was the main land owner in this area prior to 1950s, which at that time consisted of expansive gardens and farms. Beside holding other high offices such as Governor of Fars and Azerbaijan, during the constitutional period, he served from 1927 to 1933 as prime minister during the reign of Reza Shah Pahlavi. His legacy still survives in the area in the form of a mosque, a medical clinic, and a school, all named Hedayat and located on Hedayat Street.

Many foreign embassies are located in Darrous including those of Spain, Hungary, Portugal, Colombia, Argentina and Kazakhstan. In addition, Darrous is home to various United Nations agencies.

Notable current and former residents 
 Mehdi Qoli Hedayat, former Prime Minister
 Gholam-Ali Haddad-Adel, former Speaker of Parliament
 Fereydoun Farrokhzad, singer, actor, poet, TV and radio host, writer, and opposition political figure
 Forough Farrokhzad,  poet and film director
 Mohammad-Bagher Ghalibaf, Mayor of Tehran
 Kaveh Golestan, photojournalist and artist
 Lili Golestan, translator and artistic director of Golestan Gallery
 Amir-Abbas Hoveyda, former Prime Minister of Iran
 Sir Horace Phillips, British diplomat
 Felix A. Keller, businessman

See also 
Sharifa-ha House

References 

Neighbourhoods in Tehran